Emre Arolat (born 24 June 1963) is a Turkish architect. In 2004, he co-founded EAA-Emre Arolat Architecture with Gonca Paşolar.

He is perhaps best known in Turkey for designing the Sancaklar Mosque.

Early life 
Arolat was born in Ankara in 1963. After completing his primary education at Galatasaray High School, he studied at Mimar Sinan University in Istanbul where he received his BArch degree in architecture in 1986 and MArch degree in 1992. He then went to work at the Metcalf and Associates Architectural Office in Washington D.C. between 1986 and 1987.

Awards 

Arolat has received many national and international awards, including the 2005 Mies van der Rohe award for European Architecture (Highly Commended); 2006 AR Awards for Emerging Architecture (Highly Commended); 2013 WAF (World Architecture Festival) Winner of Religious Buildings category with Sancaklar Mosque; 2014 WAF Winner of Shopping Category with Yalikavak Palmarina; Winner of Leisure-Led Category with Antakya Museum Hotel; WAF Winner of Infrastructure Category with Cukurova Airport in 2015 and Winner of Culture Category with Istanbul Antrepo 5 – MSGSU Painting and Sculpture Museum. He also received National Architecture Awards in the category of "Design" and "Building" in 1992, 2002, 2004, 2008, 2012 and 2014. He has been awarded the Aga Khan Award for Architecture in 2010 with the Ipekyol Textile Factory Building. In 2015 Sancaklar Mosque was awarded ArchDaily's Best Building of the Year and Mies van der Rohe award for European Architecture-Best 40 Building of the Year, also nominated for Design Museum-Designs of the Year award. In May 2015, the International Academy of Architecture accorded Emre Arolat the title of professor of the academy in recognition of his achievements in the development of contemporary architecture.

Teaching 

Since 1998, Emre Arolat has taught in architectural schools in Turkey and abroad, including Mimar Sinan University, Istanbul Bilgi University, Berlage Institute for Architecture, TU Delft and Erciyes University. He was also visiting lecturer at Pratt Institute, the Middle East Technical University and Istanbul Technical University. He has been invited to serve as a jury member for numerous architectural design competitions in Turkey and abroad, including the WAF (World Architecture Festival), European 8, Izmir Metropolitan Municipality Opera House Architectural Design Competition and in 2014 the Çanakkale Antenna Tower International Competition and the CSBE (Center for the Study of the Built Environment) Student Award for Architectural Excellence in Amman. He was the 2017 Norman R. Foster Visiting Professor at Yale School of Architecture.

Exhibitions 
Arolat was one of two curators of the first Istanbul Design Biennial in 2012. He also curated "Musibet", an exhibition focusing on the social and physical effects of the rapid transformation processes taking place in Istanbul. The EAA curated the exhibitions "Nazaran.../With regard to...” in 2006, "An/Moment" in 2012 and ”Fabrika/The Factory" in 2013.

In 2015 Arolat curated EAA's exhibition, "ist-on situations" at RIBA, London. The exhibition explored a timeline beginning with the mid-19th century showing key events or turning points in the course of the urban stories of London and Istanbul. Through a dual city approach the practice reveals "situations" that unite and differentiate these two cities at the east and west ends of Europe in their development. Along with the visual material and text focusing on the background of the urban situations, a selection of recent projects and those underway by Emre Arolat Architecture (EAA) in Istanbul were showcased as 'agents' of the current urban scene. The exhibition featured original drawings, models, photographs and films of EAA's projects.

Publication 

EAA designs have been described in various publications.

"Emre Arolat: Buildings / Projects 1998–2005" is the first monograph by Emre Arolat. It uses thirty projects to explore the studio's architectural approach. The book “Dalaman Airport” explores the experience of producing this large building. EAA was the editor of the books "Nazaran.../With regard to...” and ”Fabrika/The Factory" which was published alongside the exhibitions.

In September 2013, Rizzoli NY published "EAA- Emre Arolat Architects: Context and Plurality", a monograph edited by Philip Jodido and Suha Özkan, covering 34 projects of the office. It was the first Rizzoli book publication for a Turkish architect. The second volume of EAA-Emre Arolat Architecture's monograph with Rizzoli Electa, "Global and Local / New Projects: EAA-Emre Arolat Architecture" was published in 2020. The book highlights thirty-two projects across Turkey, the United Kingdom, Portugal, the United States, UAE, Bahamas, Republic of Tatarstan, Oman and Finland. The book contains multilayered and contextual projects like the award-winning Sancaklar Mosque and the innovative Istanbul Museum of Painting and Sculpture, which will historically document and display the largest collection of Turkish art and the Museum Hotel Antakya, in which the hotel floats over archeological artefacts without touching them.

In the same year, another book of EAA was released by ORO Editions with an introduction by Aaron Betsky. The book is an expose of an architect's inner dialogues during the design process. It reveals a detailed and extensive documentation of the internal struggle to conceptually ground and position three different works of architecture: Sancaklar Mosque, Bergama Cultural Center and Yalikavak Marina.

Books 
 Scent of The Trace, Emre Arolat, Oro Editions (2020)
Global and Local / New Projects: EAA-Emre Arolat Architecture, Philip Jodidio-Suha Özkan, Rizzoli Electa (2020)
EAA-Emre Arolat Architecture / Context And Plurality, Philip Jodidio-Suha Özkan, Rizzoli NY (2013)
 Fabrika, Milli Reasurans A.S. (2012)
 Dalaman, Yem Yayinevi (2007)
 Nazaran, Milli Reasurans A.S. (2006)
 Emre Arolat, Buildings/Projects 1998–2005, Literatür (2005)

Selected projects

References

External links

1963 births
Living people